Loun may refer to:

Loun language
Don Loun, baseball pitcher